The following is a list of cabinets of the Netherlands since 1877.

List

References

Netherlands
Cabinets